Gadkhark  is a village in the Thalisain tehsil of Bironkhal block in Pauri Garhwal district, Uttarakhand, India.

The village was established by erstwhile kings of the Panwar dynasty of Garhwal. As of 2010, the population of the village is decreasing due to lack of basic amenities and migration of the people to the nearby cities. And it is expected that in some years this village may become completely abandoned due to migration.

Demographics 
The total population of the village is 82, with 34 males and 58 females. There are eighteen households in the village.

 Literacy rate : 75.34%
 Male Literacy rate : 86.66%
 Female Literacy rate : 67.44%

Other details 
The village is linked by road to Ramnagar, Nainital and Kotdwara, Pauri Garhwal. Jogimarhi, Baijrao, Syunsi, Bironkhal, Farsari and Uffrainkhal are nearby market places and having educational institutes. A government degree college is situated in Uffrainkhal.

The nearest post office is located in Jogimarhi via Baijrao.

 Pin code : 246275
 STD code :01348

References 

Villages in Pauri Garhwal district
Garhwal division